News Corporation (abbreviated News Corp.), also variously known as News Corporation Limited, was an American multinational mass media corporation controlled by media mogul Rupert Murdoch and headquartered at 1211 Avenue of the Americas in New York City. Prior to its split in 2013, it was the world's largest media company in terms of total assets and the world's fourth largest media group in terms of revenue, and News Corporation had become a media powerhouse since its inception, dominating the news, television, film, and print industries.

News Corporation was a publicly traded company listed on NASDAQ. Formerly incorporated in Adelaide, South Australia, the company was re-incorporated under Delaware General Corporation Law after a majority of shareholders approved the move on November 12, 2004. News Corporation was headquartered at 1211 Avenue of the Americas, New York, in the newer 1960s–1970s corridor of the Rockefeller Center complex.

On June 28, 2012, after concerns from shareholders in response to its recent scandals and to "unlock even greater long-term shareholder value", founder Rupert Murdoch announced that News Corporation's assets would be split into two publicly traded companies, one oriented towards media, and the other towards publishing. The formal split was completed on June 28, 2013; where the present News Corp. was renamed 21st Century Fox and consisted primarily of media outlets, while a new News Corp was formed to take on the publishing and Australian broadcasting assets.

Its major holdings at the time of the split were News Limited (a group of newspaper publishers in Murdoch's native Australia), News International (a newspaper publisher in the United Kingdom, whose properties include The Times, The Sun, and the now-defunct News of the World (the subject of a phone hacking scandal that led to its closure in July 2011), Dow Jones & Company (an American publisher of financial news outlets, including The Wall Street Journal), the book publisher HarperCollins, and the Fox Entertainment Group (then owners of the 20th Century Fox film studio and the Fox Broadcasting Company television network).

History
News Corp was created in 1980 by Rupert Murdoch, as a holding company for News Limited. News Limited was created in 1923 in Adelaide by James Edward Davidson, funded by the Collins House mining empire for the purpose of publishing anti-union propaganda; subsequently the controlling interest was bought by The Herald and Weekly Times. In 1949, Sir Keith Murdoch took control of The Adelaide News. When he died in 1952, his son Rupert inherited a controlling interest in an Adelaide afternoon tabloid, The News. News Limited operates today as News Corporation's Australian brand, The Australian operating out of Surry Hills, in Sydney.

Expansion into the United States
News Ltd. made its first acquisition in the United States in 1973, when it purchased the San Antonio Express and News (the two papers merged in 1984). Soon afterwards it founded the National Star, a supermarket tabloid, and in 1976 it purchased the New York Post from Dorothy Schiff for $31 million.

In 1984, News Corp acquired the Chicago Sun-Times from Field Enterprises (later sold in 1986 to the American Publishing Company subsidiary of Canada-based Hollinger Inc.) for $90 million and  Travel Weekly and other trade magazines from Ziff Davis. In March 1985, News Corp bought a 50% stake in TCF Holdings, the holding company of the movie studio 20th Century Fox from Marc Rich for $162 million, and later acquired the remaining stake from Marvin Davis in September for $325 million.

Two months after the acquisition of the 50% stake in TCF Holdings, on May 6, 1985, News Corp announced it was buying the Metromedia television stations and its syndication arm Metromedia Producers Corporation from John Kluge for $3.5 billion, setting the stage for the launch of a fourth U.S. commercial broadcasting television network.  On September 4, 1985, Murdoch became a naturalized citizen to satisfy the legal requirement that only United States citizens could own American television stations. In 1986, the Metromedia deal was completed, and the Fox Broadcasting Company, simply known as Fox,  launched on October 9, with Joan Rivers' The Late Show as its late-night program, it would later  air prime-time programming  starting in April 1987.

Expansion and consolidation
In 1986 and 1987, News Corp (through subsidiary News International) moved to adjust the production process of its British newspapers, over which the printing unions had long maintained a highly restrictive grip. A number of senior Australian media moguls were brought into Murdoch's powerhouse, including John Dux, who was managing director of the South China Morning Post. This led to a confrontation with the printing unions National Graphical Association and Society of Graphical and Allied Trades. The move of News International's London operation to Wapping in the East End resulted in nightly battles outside the new plant. Delivery vans and depots were frequently and violently attacked. Ultimately the unions capitulated.

In 1987, News Corp acquired  the book publisher Harper and Row for $300 million, and later acquired the British book publisher William Collins, Sons in 1989 for $721 million, who later merged with Harper to form HarperCollins that same year.

In 1988, News Corp acquired the Philadelphia-based Triangle Publications, publisher of the magazines TV Guide, Seventeen, and the Daily Racing Form for $3 billion. To raise money, the trade publications were sold to Reed International.

By 1992, News Corp had incurred large debts, which forced it to sell many of the American magazine interests it had acquired in the mid-1980s to K-III Communications, as well spinning off long-held Australian magazines interests as Pacific Magazines. Much of this debt came from its stake in the Sky Television satellite network in the UK, which incurred massive losses in its early years of operation, which (like many of its business interests) was heavily subsidised with profits from its other holdings until it was able to force rival satellite operator BSB to accept a merger on its terms in 1990. (The merged company, BSkyB, has dominated the British pay-TV market since.)

In 1993, News Corp acquired a 63.6% stake of the Hong Kong-based STAR TV satellite network from Pearson PLC for over $500 million, followed by the purchase of the remaining 36.4% in July 1995. Murdoch declared that:

In 1995, the Fox network became the object of scrutiny from the Federal Communications Commission (FCC) when it was alleged that its Australian base made Murdoch's ownership of Fox illegal. The FCC, however, ruled in Murdoch's favor, stating that his ownership of Fox was in the public's best interests. It was also noted that the stations themselves were owned by a separate company whose chief shareholder was a U.S. citizen, Murdoch, although nearly all of the stations' equity was controlled by News Corp. In the same year, News Corporation announced a deal with MCI Communications to develop a major news website as well as funding a conservative news magazine, The Weekly Standard. In the same year, News Corp launched the Foxtel pay television network in Australia in a partnership with Telstra and Publishing and Broadcasting Limited.

On July 17, 1996, News Corporation announced that it would acquire  television production and broadcasting company New World Communications (who acquired a 20% stake in 1994 for $200 million), for $2.48 billion in stock and was completed on January 22, 1997.

On October 7, 1996, the Fox Entertainment Group launched the Fox News Channel, a 24-hour cable news network to compete against Time Warner's rival channel CNN.

In 1999, News Corporation significantly expanded its music holdings in Australia by acquiring the controlling share in a leading Australian-based label, Michael Gudinski's Mushroom Records, merging it with already held Festival Records to create Festival Mushroom Records (FMR). Both Festival and FMR were managed by Rupert Murdoch's son James Murdoch for several years.

Also mid 1999, The Economist reported that News Corp paid comparatively lower taxes, and Newscorp Investments specifically had made £11.4 billion ($20.1 billion) in profits over the previous 11 years but had not paid net corporation tax. It also reported that after an examination of the available accounts, Newscorp could normally have been expected to pay corporate tax of approximately $350 million. The article explained that in practice, the corporation's complex structure, international scope, and use of offshore tax havens allowed News Corporation to pay minimal taxes.

Development since 2000
In late 2003, News Corp acquired a 34% stake in Hughes Electronics (now DirecTV Group, operator of the largest American satellite TV system, from General Motors for US$6 billion. DirecTV was sold to Liberty Media in 2008 in exchange for its stake in News Corporation.

In January 2005, shortly after reincorporation in the United States, News Corporation announced that it was buying out Fox Entertainment Group. The manoeuvre delisted Fox from the New York Stock Exchange; Fox had traded on the NYSE under the ticker FOX.

In 2004, Murdoch set aside $2 billion and handpicked a team of young executives to look at possible ways to use the Web as a distribution platform. That team was composed of four rising stars: Ross Levinsohn, Adam Bain, Travis Katz, and Michael Kirby.  The four became the backbone of what would become News Corp's digital division, Fox Interactive Media.

Shortly after, in July 2005, News Corporation purchased the social networking website Myspace for $580 million. News Corporation had beat out Viacom by offering a higher price for the website, and the purchase was seen as a good investment at the time. Of the $580 million purchase price, approximately $327 million has been attributed to the value of Myspace according to the financial adviser fairness opinion. Within a year, Myspace had tripled in value from its purchase price.

In February 2007, Murdoch announced at the McGraw-Hill Media Summit that the Fox Entertainment Group would launch a new business news channel later in the year, which would compete directly against rival network CNBC. Murdoch explained that the channel would be more "business-friendly" than CNBC, because he felt that they "leap on every scandal, or what they think is a scandal." In July 2007, News Corp. reached a deal to acquire Dow Jones & Company, owners of The Wall Street Journal, of $5 billion for. Despite CNBC already having a contract with Dow Jones to provide content and services to the network, the Fox Entertainment Group officially launched the Fox Business Network on October 15, 2007. Alexis Glick, the network's original morning show host and vice president of business news, indicated that its lawyers had reviewed the details of Dow Jones' contract with CNBC, but noted that it would still "actively use" other Dow Jones properties.

In September 2009, News Corp established NewsCore, a global wire service set up to provide news stories to all of News Corp's journalistic outlets.

In April 2010, News Corporation sold Bulgarian broadcaster bTV, which it launched on 1 June 2000, as part of a deal to Central European Media Enterprises (CME) for $400 million in addition to another $13 million for working capital adjustment. The deal included cable channels bTV Comedy and Btv Cinema and News Corporation's 74% stake in Radio Company CJ which included five radio stations.

In September 2010, due to the Fijian government's requirement that the country's media outlet must be 90% owned by Fiji Nationals, News Corporation sold 90% of their stake in their Fijian newspapers (Fiji Times, Nai Lalakai, and Shanti Dut) to Motibhai Group of Companies.

In late February 2011, News Corp officially put the now-struggling Myspace up for sale, which was estimated to be worth $50–200 million. Losses from the last quarter of 2010 were $156 million, over double of the previous year, which dragged down the otherwise strong results of parent News Corp. Its struggles were attributed to the growth of the competing social network Facebook. The deadline for bids, May 31, 2011, passed without any above the reserve price of $100 million being submitted. The rapid deterioration in Myspace's business during the most recent quarter had deterred many potent suitors. Later in June, Specific Media and pop singer Justin Timberlake bought the site for $35 million, which CNN reported noted was "far less than the $580 million News Corp. paid for Myspace in 2005." Murdoch went on to call the Myspace purchase a "huge mistake".

On July 13, 2011, Rupert Murdoch announced that the company would withdraw its takeover bid for BSkyB due to concerns relating to the News of the World scandal. News Corporation already owned, and continues to own, 39.1% of BSkyB.

On June 6, 2012, News Corporation announced that it would buy out ESPN Inc.'s stake in ESPN Star Sports to gain full control over the Asia-Pacific sports network. On November 20, 2012, News Corporation announced that it would acquire a 49% stake in the regional sports network YES Network, owned by the Major League Baseball team New York Yankees. In January 2013, News Corp. attained 54.5% majority control of Sky Deutschland.

On February 4, 2013, News Corporation announced the sale of IGN and its related properties to the publishing company Ziff Davis. News Corp. had planned to spin-off IGN as an independent company, but failed to do so.

Scandals

In July 2011, News Corp closed down the News of the World newspaper in the United Kingdom due to allegations of phone hackings. The allegations include trying to access former Prime Minister Gordon Brown's voice mail, and obtain information from his bank accounts, family's medical records, and private legal files. Allegations of hacking have also been brought up in relation to former Prime Minister Tony Blair, and the Royal Family. Other allegations put out by The Guardian newspaper include the exploitation, with intent to gain access to or use private information, of a list of 4,332 names or partial names, 2,987 mobile phone numbers, 30 audio tapes of varying length and 91 PIN codes, of a kind required to access the voicemail of the minority of targets who change the factory settings on their mobile phones. The names are said to include those of British victims of September 11, 2001 terror attacks, family members of victims of the "7/7" bombings on London's transit system, family members of British troops killed overseas, Milly Dowler, a 13-year-old missing British girl who was later found dead, actor Hugh Grant and a lawyer representing the family of Princess Diana's lover at the inquest into her death.

On July 13, 2011, News Corp withdrew its bid to purchase the final 61% stake in BSkyB after pressure from both the Labour and Conservative Parties in Parliament.

Allegations about the violation of ethical standards by the News Corporation subsidiary News of the World have been speculatively applied to News Corporation holdings in the United States. Senator John Rockefeller (D-WV) stated on July 12, 2011, that there should be a government investigation into News Corporation "to ensure that Americans have not had their privacy violated." His statement was echoed on Wednesday by Sen. Robert Menendez (D-NJ), who specifically requested an investigation into 9/11 victims, as well as Sen. Frank Lautenberg (D-NJ) who encouraged an investigation by the Securities and Exchange Commission. On July 13, 2011, Representative Peter King (R-NY) wrote a letter to the FBI requesting an investigation into News Corporation's ethical practices, and on July 14, the FBI opened a probe into the hacking of 9/11 victims. Les Hinton, chief executive of the media group's Dow Jones, resigned on July 15, saying, "I have seen hundreds of news reports of both actual and alleged misconduct during the time I was executive chairman of News International and responsible for the company. The pain caused to innocent people is unimaginable. That I was ignorant of what apparently happened is irrelevant and in the circumstances I feel it is proper for me to resign from News Corp, and apologize to those hurt by the actions of the News of the World."

In 2012, following a BBC Panorama report, allegations were made that News Corp subsidiary NDS Group had used hackers to undermine pay TV rivals around the world. Some of the victims of the alleged hacking, such as Austar, were later taken over by News Corp and others such as Ondigital later went bust. NDS had originally been set up to provide security to News Corp's pay TV interests but emails obtained by Fairfax Media revealed they had also pursued a wider agenda by distributing the keys to rival set-top box operators and seeking to obtain phone records of suspected rivals. The emails were from the hard drive of NDS European chief Ray Adams. In 2012, it was also revealed that Australian Federal police were working with UK police to investigate hacking by News Corp.

On February 4, 2022, News Corp was reported suffered a "persistent cyberattack" in January. The suspected Chinese hackers targeted one of its IT providers, and successfully got some anonymous data. According to News Corp, the incident did not appear to affect systems holding customer and financial data.

Split and 21st Century Fox's eventual sale to Disney

On June 28, 2012, Rupert Murdoch announced that, after concerns from shareholders in response to the recent scandals and to "unlock even greater long-term shareholder value", News Corporation's assets would be split into two publicly traded companies, one oriented towards media, and the other towards publishing. News Corp's publishing operations were spun out into a second News Corporation with Robert James Thomson, editor of The Wall Street Journal, as CEO. The original News Corporation, which retained most of its media properties (such as the Fox Entertainment Group and 20th Century Fox) and Murdoch as CEO, was renamed 21st Century Fox. Murdoch remained chairman for both companies.

Shareholders approved the split on June 11, 2013. On June 19, 2013, preliminary trading for the new News Corp on the Australian Securities Exchange commenced in preparation for the formal split that was finalized on June 28, 2013. Shareholders received one share of New News Corp for every four shares they owned of the old News Corp. The two new companies began trading on the NASDAQ on July 1, 2013. 21st Century Fox and most of its businesses were later acquired by the Walt Disney Company in 2019; its US broadcast, sports, and news assets were spun-off to Fox Corporation which would be retained under Murdoch ownership.

Shareholders
In August 2005, the Murdoch family owned only about 29% of the company of which as of June 2013 had been diluted to around 17%. However, nearly all of these shares were voting shares which currently stand at 39% of the total voting shares, and Rupert Murdoch retained effective control of the company. Nonetheless, John Malone of Liberty Media had built up a large stake, with about half of the shares being voting shares. Therefore, in November 2006, News Corporation announced its intention to transfer its 38.5% interest in DirecTV Group to John Malone's Liberty Media; in return it bought back Liberty's 16.3% stake in News Corp., giving Murdoch tighter control of the latter firm. Murdoch sold 17.5 million class A shares in December 2007.
Another major stakeholder has been Al-Waleed bin Talal, of the Saudi Royal Family. In 1997, Time reported that Al-Waleed owned about five percent of News Corporation. In 2010, Alwaleed's stake in News Corp. was about 7 percent, amounting to $3 billion. In 2013, News Corp. had a $175 million (19 percent) investment in Al-Waleed's Rotana Group, the Arab world's largest entertainment company. Al-Waleed sold all his shares in November 2017

Annual conference
News Corporation organized an annual management conference, discussing media issues related to geopolitics. Attendees included News Corporation executives, senior journalists, politicians and celebrities. Previous events were in Cancún, Mexico, and the Hayman Island off the coast of Australia. The events were private and secretive, there are no records available for the agenda or talks given at the conferences, and no uninvited journalists are permitted access.

The 2006 event in Pebble Beach, California was led by Rupert Murdoch. According to a copy of the agenda leaked to the Los Angeles Times and other media accounts, issues discussed related from Europe to broadcasting and new media, terrorism to the national policy. The event included speeches from Murdoch, Actor and former governor of California Arnold Schwarzenegger, former British Prime Minister Tony Blair, Bono, Al Gore, Senator John McCain and Bill Clinton while Israel's President, Shimon Peres, appeared on a panel named "Islam and the West". Other notable attendees included Newt Gingrich and Nicole Kidman.

Political donations
In anticipation of US midterm elections, News Corporation donated $1 million to the Republican Governors Association in June 2010. The move was criticized by Democrats, who said this was evidence of News Corporation's news outlets conservative leanings (see Fox News Channel controversies). The Democratic Governors Association also criticized the donation and demanded more transparency in the reporting by News Corporation companies. DGA head Nathan Daschle wrote to the chairman of News Corporation company Fox News, Roger Ailes: "In the interest of some fairness and balance, I request that you add a formal disclaimer to your coverage any time any of your programs covers governors or gubernatorial races between now and election day."

Around the same time, News Corporation also donated $1 million to the United States Chamber of Commerce. The Chamber aggressively supported the Republican effort to retake Congress in 2010. This donation and an earlier $1 million contribution that News Corporation made to the Republican Governor's Association led media critics to question whether the company had crossed an ethical line for a media company.

Corporate governance

The company's Board of Directors consisted of 16 individuals at the time of its break up: 
Rupert Murdoch (Chairman of the Board and Chief Executive Officer)
José María Aznar (Former Prime Minister of Spain)
Natalie Bancroft (Director)
Peter Barnes
James W. Breyer
Chase Carey (President and Chief Operating Officer)
Elaine Chao
David F. DeVoe (Chief Financial Officer)
Viet Dinh
Sir Roderick Ian Eddington
Joel I. Klein (Executive Vice President)
James Murdoch (Chairman & Chief Executive Officer, Europe & Asia)
Lachlan Murdoch
Álvaro Uribe (Former President of Colombia)
Stanley S. Shuman (Director Emeritus)
Arthur M. Siskind (Director Emeritus, Senior Advisor to the Chairman)

Office of the chairman
Rupert Murdoch (Chairman and CEO)
Chase Carey (President, Chief Operating Officer & Deputy Chairman)
David DeVoe (Chief Financial Officer)
James Murdoch (Deputy Chief Operating Officer; Chairman and CEO, International)
Daniel Suárez García (Chairman and CEO, Latin America)

Final holdings

News Corporation split up to 21st Century Fox and the current incarnation of News Corporation on June 28, 2013. All media and broadcasting assets, except media assets owned by News Limited, now belong to The Walt Disney Company and Fox Corporation (successors to 21st Century Fox), its legal successors. Meanwhile, newspapers and other publishing assets, including media assets under News Limited, were spun off as a new News Corp.

Music and radio
Fox Film Music Group
Fox News Radio
Wireless Group Plc (acquired in June 2016, encompassing UK & Ireland radio stations Virgin Radio, TalkSport, U105 Belfast, LMFM (Louth-Meath), Q102 Dublin, FM104, 96FM Cork)

Sport
Majority ownership of the Brisbane Broncos (68.9%) and full ownership of the Melbourne Storm rugby league team.
Colorado Rockies (15%)

Studios
Fox Entertainment Group: 20th Century Fox's parent company
20th Century Fox: a film production/distribution company (transferred to Disney)
Fox Searchlight Pictures – specialized films (transferred to Disney).
Fox 2000 Pictures – general audience feature films (transferred to Disney).
20th Century Fox Animation
Fox Music
20th Century Fox International
20th Century Fox Español
20th Century Fox Home Entertainment
20th Century Fox Television – primetime television programming. (partially transferred to Disney)
20th Television – television distribution (syndication).
20th Century Fox Television Distribution – television distribution.
Fox 21 – low scripted/budgeted television production company.
Fox Television Animation – animation production company.
Fox Television Studios (productions)- market specific programming e.g. COPS and network television company.
Fox Television Studios International
Fox World Productions
Fox Faith – Promotion and distribution of Christian and related "family friendly" movies on DVD and some theatrical release.
Fox Studios Australia, Sydney, New South Wales
Blue Sky Studios – production of CGI films e.g. Ice Age (transferred to Disney).
Fox Filmed Entertainment
New Regency Productions (20%) – general audience feature films.
Regency Enterprises (20%) – parent company of New Regency Productions (50%).
Fox Star Studios fully owned -the Studio for Indian Movie's Production and Distribution.

TV
News Corp agreed to sell eight of its television stations to Oak Hill Capital Partners for approximately $1.1 billion as of December 22, 2007. The stations are US Fox affiliates. These stations, along with those already acquired by Oak Hill that were formerly owned by The New York Times Company, formed the nucleus of Oak Hill's Local TV LLC division.

Broadcast
Fox Broadcasting Company (Fox), a US broadcast television network
MyNetworkTV, a US broadcast television network
Fox Television Stations, a group of owned and operated Fox television stations

Satellite television
BSkyB, United Kingdom & Ireland (39.1% holding). In practice, a controlling interest.
Sky Network Television, New Zealand (44%)
Sky Italia (100%), Italy's largest pay TV service (previously owning part of Stream TV)
Sky Deutschland (54.5%), Germany's largest pay TV provider
Tata Sky (30%), an Indian DirectToHome TeleVision Service Provider. (in partnership with Tata Group (70%))
Foxtel (25%), Australia, a joint venture with Telstra (50%) and Consolidated Media Holdings (25%)
FOX Italy, Italian Broadcast and Production Company (with 2 HDTV)
Star TV Channels (Satellite TeleVision Asian Region), an Asian satellite TV service having 300 million viewers in 53 countries, mainly in India, China & other Asian countries
Phoenix Television (17.6%), satellite TV network with landing rights in Hong Kong, and select provinces on Mainland China.

Cable
Cable TV channels owned (in whole or part) and operated by News Corporation include:
Fox Business Network, a business news channel.
Fox Classics, a channel airing classic TV shows and movies
Fox Classics (Japan)
Fox Sports & Entertainment/Fox BS238
Fox Movie Channel, an all-movie channel that airs commercial-free movies from 20th Century Fox's film library
Fox News Channel, a 24-hour news and opinion channel
Fox Sports Networks, a chain of US regional cable news television networks broadcasting local sporting events linked together by national sports news programming. Local channels include "Fox Sports Southwest", "Fox Sports Detroit", etc. (some affiliates are owned by Cablevision.)
SportSouth, a regional sports network in the United States, with its headquarters in Atlanta, and affiliate of Fox Sports Net.
Sun Sports a regional sports network in the United States, with its headquarters in Miami, Florida, and affiliate of Fox Sports Net.
Fox College Sports, a college sports network consisting of three regionally aligned channels, mostly with archived Fox Sports Net programmes but also some live and original content.
Fox Sports International
Fox Soccer Channel, a United States digital cable and satellite network specialising mainly in soccer.
Fox Soccer Plus, a sister network to FSC, but including coverage of other sports, most notably rugby. Launched in 2010 after News Corporation picked up many of the broadcast rights abandoned by Setanta Sports when it stopped broadcasting in the U.S.
Fox Pan American Sports (37.9%) – joint venture with Hicks, Muse, and Tate & Furst.
Fox Sports en Español (50%), a Spanish-language North American cable sports network; its sports line-up is tailored to appeal to a Latin American audience.
Fox Sports en Latinoamérica, a Latin American satellite and cable sports network.
FX Networks, a cable network broadcasting reruns of programming previously shown on other channels, but recently creating its own programming, including the Emmy Award-winning programmes The Shield and Damages.
SPEED
FUEL TV
Big Ten Network, cable and satellite channel dedicated to The Big Ten Conference, launched August 2007 (49%)
National Geographic Channel (joint venture with National Geographic Society) 67%
 National Geographic Channel International 75%
Nat Geo Mundo (joint venture with National Geographic Society)
Nat Geo Wild (joint venture with National Geographic Society)
YES Network (49%), regional cable sports network; broadcasts New York Yankees and Brooklyn Nets games, among other teams.
 Fox International Channels, domestic cable channels offering different formats of Fox programming in over thirty countries worldwide.
Fox
Fox Life
Fox Life HD
Fox Filipino
Fox Crime
FX
Fox Horror
Fox Movies
Fox Sports
Speed Channel
National Geographic Channel
National Geographic Channel HD
National Geographic Wild
National Geographic Adventure
National Geographic Music
National Geographic Junior
Cult
Next:HD
Voyage
Real Estate TV
BabyTV
Fox Toma 1 – Spanish-language television production.
Fox Telecolombia – Spanish-language television production. (51%)
Utarget.Fox – European and Latin American online ad company, plus now handles TV ad sales.
Central & South America
Fox Latin American Channels – channels available in over 17 countries in Latin America
National Geographic Channel
National Geographic Channel HD
National Geographic Wild
Nat Geo Music
Universal Channel
Universal HD
Fox Channel
Fox HD
FX
Fox Life
Fox Sports
Speed Channel
Baby TV
Utilisima
Fox One-Stop Media – advertising sales for company owned and third party channels in Latin America
LAPTV (60%) (Latin American Pay Television) operates 8 cable movie channels throughout South America excluding Brazil.
Telecine (12.5%) operates 5 cable movie channels in Brazil.
Australia
Premier Media Group (50%)
Fox Sports 1
Fox Sports 2
Fox Sports 3
SPEED
FoxSportsNews
Fuel TV Australia
Premium Movie Partnership (20%) – movie channels, a joint venture between 20th Century Fox, Sony, NBCUniversal, Viacom and Liberty Media
PLATFORMS
India
Hathway Cable & Datacom (22.2%), India's 2nd largest cable network through 7 cities including Bangalore, Chennai, Delhi, Mumbai & Pune
Taiwan
Total TV (20%), a pay TV platform with JV partner KOO's Group majority owner (80%). News Corp also has a 20% interest in the KOO's Group directly.

Internet
News Corp. Digital Media
Foxsports.com – website with sports news, scores, statistics, video and fantasy sports
Hulu (27%) – online video streaming site in partnership with NBCUniversal and Disney.
Flektor – provides Web-based tools for photo and video editing and mashups.
Slingshot Labs – web development incubator (Includes the sites DailyFill).
Strategic Data Corp – interactive advertising company which develops technology to deliver targeted internet advertising.
Scout.com
WhatIfSports.com – sports simulation and prediction website. Also provides fantasy-style sports games to play.
Indya.com – 'India's no. 1 Entertainment Portal'
ROO Group Inc (5% increasing to 10% with performance targets)
News Digital Media
News.com.au – Australia's most popular news website in 2013 and as of April 2014
CareerOne.com.au (50%) – recruitment advertisement website in partnership with Monster Worldwide.
Carsguide.com.au
in2mobi.com.au
TrueLocal.com.au
Moshtix.com.au – a ticket retailer
Learning Seat
Wego News owns minority stake in Wego.com
Weair News owns minority stake in weair.com
Netus (75%) – investment co. in online properties.
Move, Inc (80%)
realtor.com – United States online real estate portal with up to date and accurate listings
move.com
listhub.com
Doorsteps
Tigerlead
Moving.com
Top Producer
Reesio
Relocation.com
SeniorHousingNet.com
REA Group (60.7%)
Realestate.com.au
Business Services s.r.l. Access our internationalization service opens to endless proposals and possibilities of rooting in markets around the world.
Casa.it (69.4%), Sky Italia also holds a 30.6% share
atHome group, operator of leading realestate websites in Luxembourg, France, Belgium and Germany.
Altowin (51%), provider of office management tools for realestate agents in Belgium.
Propertyfinders.com (50%), News International holds the remaining 50%
Sherlock Publications, owner of hotproperty.co.uk portal and magazine titles 'Hot Property', 'Renting' and 'Overseas'
ukpropertyshop.co.uk, most comprehensive UK estate agent directory.
PropertyLook, property websites in Australia and New Zealand.
HomeSite.com.au home renovation and improvement website.
Square Foot Limited, Hong Kong's largest English Language property magazine and website
Primedia – Holding co. of Inside DB, a Hong Kong lifestyle magazine.
TadpoleNet Media (10%) Hosts of ArmySailor.com
New Zealand
Fatso – leading online DVD subscription service (ownership through stake in Sky Network Television).
Fox Networks – one of the largest international ad networks.
Expedient InfoMedia blog network.
Storyful
Unruly
The News Broadcasting Corporation
TNBCLive.com - United States's popular news website in 2017 and as of April 2022

Other assets
Fox Sports Grill (50%) – Upscale sports bar and restaurant with 7 locations: Scottsdale, Arizona; Irvine, California; Seattle; Plano, Texas; Houston; San Diego; and Atlanta.
Fox Sports Skybox (70%) – Sports fans' Bar & Grill at Staples Center and six airport restaurants.
News America Marketing (US) – (100%) – nation's leading marketing services company, products include a portfolio of in-store, home-delivered and online media under the SmartSource brand.
Rotana (19%) – Largest Arab entertainment company owned by Saudi Prince Al-Waleed bin Talal
The Daily – iPad only newspaper delivered daily.
Making Fun – social game developer for making games for social networking sites, smartphones, tablets and other devices.
Stockpoint
Lane Bryant

Books
HarperCollins book publishing company
HarperCollins India 
Zondervan Christian book publisher
Inspirio – religious gift production.

Newspapers
Australia published by News Limited.
The Australian (Nationwide)
Community Media Group (16 QLD & NSW suburban/regional titles)
Cumberland-Courier Newspapers (23 suburban/commuter titles)
The Courier-Mail (Queensland)
The Sunday Mail (Queensland)
The Cairns Post (Cairns, Queensland)
The Gold Coast Bulletin (Gold Coast, Queensland)
The Townsville Bulletin (Townsville, Queensland)
The Daily Telegraph (New South Wales)
The Sunday Telegraph (New South Wales)
Herald Sun (Victoria)
Sunday Herald Sun (Victoria)
The Weekly Times (Victoria)
Leader Newspapers (33 suburban Melbourne titles)
MX (Sydney, Melbourne and Brisbane CBD)
The Geelong Advertiser (Geelong, Victoria)
The Advertiser (South Australia)
The Sunday Mail (South Australia)
Messenger Newspapers (11 suburban Adelaide, SA titles)
The Sunday Times (Western Australia)
The Mercury (Tasmania)
Quest Newspapers (19 suburban Brisbane, QLD titles)
The Sunday Tasmanian (Tasmania)
Northern Territory News (Northern Territory)
The Sunday Territorian (Northern Territory)
The Tablelands Advertiser (Atherton Tablelands and the Far North, Queensland)
Fiji
Fiji Times (National) (10%)
 Nai Lalakai (10%)
 Shanti Dut (10%)
Papua New Guinea
Papua New Guinea Post-Courier (National) (62.5%)
UK and Ireland newspapers, published by subsidiaries of News International Ltd.
News Group Newspapers Ltd.
The Sun (published in Scotland as The Scottish Sun and in Ireland as The Irish Sun)
The Sun on Sunday
Times Newspapers Ltd.
The Sunday Times
The Times
The Times Literary Supplement
US newspapers and magazines
The New York Post
 Community Newspaper Group
 The Brooklyn Paper
 Bronx Times-Reporter
 Brooklyn Courier-Life
 TimesLedger Newspapers
Dow Jones & Company
Consumer Media Group
The Wall Street Journal
Wall Street Journal Europe
Wall Street Journal Asia
Barron's – weekly financial markets magazine.
Marketwatch – Financial news and information website.
Far Eastern Economic Review
Enterprise Media Group
Dow Jones Newswires – global, real-time news and information provider.
Factiva – provides business news and information together with content delivery tools and services.
Dow Jones Indexes – stock market indexes and indicators, including the Dow Jones Industrial Average.
Dow Jones Financial Information Services – produces databases, electronic media, newsletters, conferences, directories, and other information services on specialised markets and industry sectors.
Betten Financial News – leading Dutch language financial and economic news service.
Local Media Group
Ottaway Community Newspapers – 8 daily and 15 weekly regional newspapers.
STOXX (33%)- joint venture with Deutsche Boerse and SWG Group for the development and distribution of Dow Jones STOXX indices.
Vedomosti (33%) – Russia's leading financial newspaper (joint venture with Financial Times and Independent Media).
SmartMoney
The Timesledger Newspapers of Queens, New York:
Bayside Times, Whitestone Times, Flushing Times, Little Neck Ledger, Jamaica Times, Astoria Times, Forest Hills Ledger
The Courier-Life Newspapers in Brooklyn
The Brooklyn Paper
Caribbean Life
Flatbush Jewish Journal

Magazines
U.S.A.
SmartSource Magazine (weekly Sunday newspaper coupon insert)
The Weekly Standard
Australia
Alpha Magazine
Australian Country Style
Australian Golf Digest
Australian Good Taste
Big League
BCME
Delicious
Donna Hay
Fast Fours
GQ (Australia)
Gardening Australia
InsideOut (Aust)
Lifestyle Pools
Live to Ride
Notebook
Overlander 4WD
Modern Boating
Modern Fishing
Parents
Pure Health
Super Food Ideas
Truck Australia
Truckin' Life
twowheels
twowheels scooter
Vogue (Australia)
Vogue Entertaining & Travel
Vogue Living
UK
Inside Out magazine

See also

List of conglomerates

References

External links

News Corp at Bloomberg Businessweek

News Corporation collected news and commentary at The New York Times
News Corp. Holdings and Timeline at Columbia Journalism Review, as of December 24, 2010
 

 
Fox Corporation
Defunct mass media companies of Australia
Defunct mass media companies of the United States
Defunct companies based in New York City
Companies based in Manhattan
Companies formerly listed on the Australian Securities Exchange
Companies formerly listed on the Nasdaq
Companies formerly listed on the New York Stock Exchange
Conglomerate companies of the United States
Mass media companies based in New York City
Multinational companies based in New York City
Publishing companies based in New York City
Australian companies established in 1980
American companies disestablished in 2013
2004 establishments in New York City
2013 disestablishments in New York (state)
Conglomerate companies established in 2004
Mass media companies established in 1980
Mass media companies established in 2004
Mass media companies disestablished in 2013
Mass media companies of the United States
Conservative media in the United States